Béla Oláh (born 27 March 1956) is a Hungarian weightlifter. He competed at the 1980 Summer Olympics and the 1988 Summer Olympics.

References

External links
 

1956 births
Living people
Hungarian male weightlifters
Olympic weightlifters of Hungary
Weightlifters at the 1980 Summer Olympics
Weightlifters at the 1988 Summer Olympics
Sportspeople from Szabolcs-Szatmár-Bereg County
20th-century Hungarian people